Vincent Holmes (also known as V.J. Holmes or Vince Holmes, born July 1, 1996) is an American basketball player. As an NCAA Division I men's basketball player, he has played for the Lamar Cardinals since 2017. Holmes was coached by Lamar Cardinals head coach Tic Price and assistant coach Brandon Chappell.

Early life
Holmes was born in Jupiter, Florida and attended the Oxbridge Academy of the Palm Beaches, where he played for the school's basketball team from 2013–14. While at Oxbridge Academy, Holmes averaged 18.5 points per game scoring a high of 24 points in the divisional playoff game, leading the team to its first ever conference championship. He holds the title of Leading Scorer in a single season 2013–2014. Holmes also received Player of the Game awards from 2013–14, and was named to the All-County Team and as Defensive Player of the Year. From 2014–2015, Holmes played for IMG Academy.

College career
Holmes played for Otero Junior College from 2015–16. While at Otero Junior College, he was named to the All-conference Tournament Team and lead the team to its first ever top 10 NJCAA national ranking. After playing for the men's basketball team at Otero Junior College, Holmes played for the 2016–17 James Madison Dukes men's basketball team. After the season, he transferred to the Lamar Cardinals. Along with T. J. Atwood, he was one of Lamar's top scorers during their 2019–20 season. Holmes was coached by Lamar Cardinals head coach Tic Price and assistant coach Brandon Chappell.

Statistics
Statistics for Holmes:

NCAA Division I

|-
| 2016–17
| style="text-align:left;"| James Madison Dukes
| align=center | Southland
| 25 || 12.8 || 0.300 || 0.000 || 0.667 || 1.6 || 1.2 || 0.2 || 0.2 || 1.4
|-
| 2018–19
| style="text-align:left;"| Lamar Cardinals
| align=center | Southland
| 33 || 24.2 || 0.424 || 0.185 || 0.561 || 3.0 || 2.6 || 1.2 || 0.6 || 5.1
|-
| 2019–20
| style="text-align:left;"| Lamar Cardinals
| align=center | Southland
| 31 || 30.4 || 0.437 || 0.294 || 0.717 || 3.7 || 4.8 || 2.2 || 0.3 || 10.2
|}

High school and junior college

|-
| 2013–14
| style="text-align:left;"| Oxbridge
| align=center | 
| 23 ||  || 0.51 || 0.33 || 0.59 || 3.5 || 6.0 || 2.9 || 0.7 || 18.3
|-
| 2015–16
| style="text-align:left;"| Otero
| align=center | 
| 27 || 25.0 || 0.429 || 0.250 || 0.720 || 5.0 || 6.0 || 1.6 || 0.7 || 10.2
|}

See also
2019–20 Lamar Cardinals basketball team
2018–19 Lamar Cardinals basketball team
2017–18 Lamar Cardinals basketball team
2016–17 James Madison Dukes men's basketball team

References

Scott, Thomas. (2020, January 3). Cardinals Lose Composure Late against ACU. Beaumont Enterprise. Retrieved February 2, 2020.
Faye, Matt. (2019, December 18). Lamar Basketball Set for Conference Play. Beaumont Enterprise. Retrieved February 2, 2020.
Scott, Thomas. (2019, September 5). NBA Hall of Famer Julius "Dr. J" Erving to be Keynote Speaker. Beaumont Enterprise. Retrieved February 2, 2020.

External links
Lamar Cardinals bio
ESPN stats
Sports Reference stats
V Sports Fitness

1996 births
Living people
African-American basketball players
American men's basketball players
Basketball players from Florida
IMG Academy alumni
Junior college men's basketball players in the United States
Lamar Cardinals basketball players
People from Jupiter, Florida
Point guards
Sportspeople from Palm Beach, Florida
21st-century African-American sportspeople